The 1991 Missouri Valley Conference men's basketball tournament was played after the conclusion of the 1990–1991 regular season at Kiel Auditorium in St. Louis, Missouri.

Bracket

References

1990–91 Missouri Valley Conference men's basketball season
Missouri Valley Conference men's basketball tournament
Missouri Valley Conference men's basketball tournament
College basketball tournaments in Missouri
Basketball competitions in St. Louis